Schvitz is the sixth studio album by American funk band Vulfpeck, released on 30 December 2022 through their own label, Vulf Records. After a brief hiatus, the band returned to recording together for Cory Wong's 2022 album Wong's Cafe, and performed together for the first time in three years at the Levitate Music & Arts Festival in July 2022. It is their first album to feature Wong, Antwaun Stanley and Joey Dosik as prominent performers on all or most tracks. Announced in November, the album was preceded by six singles.

Background 
In October 2020, the band issued their fifth studio album, The Joy of Music, the Job of Real Estate, containing five original tracks with the remainder containing of previously released material. Vulfpeck also released four compilation albums under the Vulf Vault header from 2020 to 2022, with each one focusing on a different band member.

All band members contributed and performed on 2022 Cory Wong's album Wong's Cafe. In August, frontman Jack Stratton released the first studio album under his solo alias Vulfmon, Here We Go Jack, featuring contributions from David T. Walker, Monica Martin and Mike Viola.

On 8 July 2022, Vulfpeck performed at the Levitate Music & Arts Festival in Marshfield, Massachusetts. It was their first live appearance since their headlining Madison Square Garden concert in 2019.

Release 
The album's title, release date, track listing and artwork were announced on 25 November 2022, alongside the release of lead single "Sauna". Schvitz is a Yiddish word for a steambath, and the videos were recorded in a sauna with the band dressed in robes and hats. Graphic designer Pseudodudo handled the cover artwork. A new single was then released every week for the next six weeks, with "In Heaven" concluding the album's rollout on 30 December. The day after Schvitz was issued, the band livestreamed a telethon on YouTube.

Reception 
In a three-star review for the Financial Times, Ludovic Hunter-Tilney concluded the album's "good humour is irresistible", highlighting "Sauna" as a "breezy piece of pop-funk plotted and arranged with pinpoint attentiveness".

Track listing 

Notes

 "Simple Step" is a cover of funk band Groove Spoon's 2010 song of the same name.
 "In Heaven" is a cover of Joey Dosik's 2018 song of the same name.
 "Serve Somebody" is a cover of Bob Dylan's 1979 song "Gotta Serve Somebody".
 "What Did You Mean By Love?" is a cover of Theo Katzman's 2019 song "What Did You Mean (When You Said Love)".

Personnel 
Musicians

 Joe Dart – bass guitar (all tracks)
 Joey Dosik – piano (1, 7), saxophone (2–3, 5, 8), vocals (3–5, 7, 10), organ (4, 9), guitar (6), writing (6), composer (5–6)
 Woody Goss – Wurlitzer (1–3, 5, 8–10), piano (4), guitar (6), writing (1), composer (1)
 Theo Katzman – vocals (1, 3–7, 10), guitar (2, 6–7, 9), drums (3, 5, 8), Wurlitzer (4), kazoo (8), writing (4–5, 9), composer (4–5, 9)
 Antwaun Stanley – vocals (1, 3–7, 9–10), drums (2), writing (5), composer (5)
 Jack Stratton – drums (1, 4, 9–10), keyboard (3, 7), piano (5), percussion (6), Wurlitzer (8), vocals (2), writing (1–3, 5, 8–10), composer (1–3, 5, 8, 10)
 Cory Wong – guitar (all tracks)

Other musicians

 Justin Douglas – composer (5)
 Bob Dylan – writing (7)
 Jacob Jeffries – vocals (3, 10), composer (3, 10), writing (3, 10)
Technical

 Jack Stratton – mixing (1–5, 7–10), overdubs (3), 
 Nick Nagurka – engineer (all tracks)

References 

Funk albums by American artists
Funk albums
2022 albums